The infraorbital margin is the lower margin of the eye socket.

Structure
It consists of the zygomatic bone and the maxilla, on which it separates the anterior and the orbital surface of the body of the maxilla.

Function
It is an attachment for the levator labii superioris muscle.

Bones of the head and neck